The following outline is provided as an overview of and topical guide to humanism:

Humanism  group of philosophies and ethical perspectives which emphasize the value and agency of human beings, individually and collectively, and generally prefers individual thought and evidence (rationalism, empiricism), over established doctrine or faith (fideism). Two common forms of humanism are religious humanism and secular humanism.

Humanism, term freely applied to a variety of beliefs, methods, and philosophies that place central emphasis on the human realm. Most frequently, however, the term is used with reference to a system of education and mode of inquiry that developed in northern Italy during the 13th and 14th centuries and later spread through continental Europe and England. Alternately known as Renaissance humanism, this program was so broadly and profoundly influential that it is one of the chief reasons why the Renaissance is viewed as a distinct historical period. Indeed, though the word Renaissance is of more recent coinage, the fundamental idea of that period as one of renewal and reawakening is humanistic in origin. But humanism sought its own philosophical bases in far earlier times and, moreover, continued to exert some of its power long after the end of the Renaissance.

Nature of humanism 
Humanism can be described as all of the following:
 Approach – manner in which a problem is solved or policy is made.
 Branch of philosophy – study of general and fundamental problems, such as those connected with reality, existence, knowledge, values, reason, mind, and language. Philosophy is distinguished from other ways of addressing such problems by its critical, generally systematic approach and its reliance on rational argument.
 Social movement – type of group action. A large informal grouping of individuals or organization which focuses on specific political or social issues. In other words, it carries out, resists or undoes a social change.
 Ethical movement –
 Philosophical movement – either the appearance or increased popularity of a specific school of philosophy, or a fairly broad but identifiable sea-change in philosophical thought on a particular subject.

Branches of humanism 
 Religious humanism – philosophy that integrates secular ethics with religious rituals and beliefs that center on human needs, interests, and abilities.
 Buddhist humanism – philosophical perspective based on the teaching of inherent dignity of all human beings, their potential for attaining highest wisdom about their condition  and their essential nature of altruism exemplified by the Bodhisattva spirit of compassion. In practical terms, humanism is expressed on the individual level through action: to "relieve sufferings and impart joy", to contribute to the welfare of society, abiding by the attitude of nonviolence supporting human rights, and acting for world peace, effectively advocating the concept of global citizenship.
 Christian humanism – emphasizes the humanity of Jesus, his social teachings and his propensity to synthesize human spirituality and materialism. It regards humanist principles like universal human dignity and individual freedom and the primacy of human happiness as essential and principal components of, or at least compatible with, the teachings of Jesus Christ.
 Christian existential humanism – theo-philosophical movement which takes an existentialist approach to Christian theology.
 Humanistic Judaism – movement in Judaism that offers a nontheistic alternative in contemporary Jewish life. It defines Judaism as the cultural and historical experience of the Jewish people and encourages humanistic and secular Jews to celebrate their Jewish identity by participating in Jewish holidays and life cycle events (such as weddings and bar and bat mitzvah) with inspirational ceremonies that draw upon but go beyond traditional literature.
 Secular humanism – philosophy or life stance that embraces human reason, ethics, social justice and philosophical naturalism, whilst specifically rejecting religious dogma, supernaturalism, pseudoscience or superstition as the basis of morality and decision making.  Alternatively known by some adherents as Humanism, specifically with a capital H to distinguish it from other forms of humanism
 Personism – ethical philosophy of personhood as typified by the thought of the preference utilitarian philosopher Peter Singer. It amounts to a branch of secular humanism with an emphasis on certain rights-criteria.
 Posthumanism – "after humanism" or "beyond humanism". It has at least five contexts, and may refer to:
 Ideas concerning the Posthuman condition – the deconstruction of the human condition by critical theorists.
 Cultural posthumanism –
 Philosophical posthumanism –
 Transhumanism – (see below)
 Antihumanism – the view that concepts of "human nature", "man", or "humanity", should be rejected as historically relative or metaphysical.
 Renaissance humanism –
 Transhumanism – international intellectual and cultural movement that affirms the possibility and desirability of fundamentally transforming the human condition by developing and making widely available technologies to eliminate aging and to greatly enhance human intellectual, physical, and psychological capacities.  That is, striving to become posthuman.  According to transhumanist thinkers, a posthuman is a hypothetical future being "whose basic capacities so radically exceed those of present humans as to be no longer unambiguously human by our current standards."

Humanist positions

Religious humanist positions

Supports 
 Various scriptural texts relating to human dignity
 Study of the humanities

Rejects 
 Atheism
 Agnosticism
 Gnosticism

Secular humanist positions

Supports
 logic
 scientific skepticism
 scientific method
 rationalism
 empiricism
 humanitarianism
 human rights
 Naturalism (philosophy)
 secularism

Rejects
 revelation
 mysticism
 tradition
 authoritarianism
 extreme skepticism

Manifestos and statements setting out humanist viewpoints 
 Humanist Manifesto
 Amsterdam Declaration 2002
 A Secular Humanist Declaration

History of humanism 

 Ancient Greek philosophy
 Democracy
 Free thinking
 Greek philosophy
 Renaissance humanism
 1853 – A Humanistic Religious Association formed in London
 1900 to the 1930s – New Humanism developed by the American scholar Irving Babbitt and the scholar and journalist Paul Elmer More.  It was an influential strand of conservative thought up to the 1930s.
 1929 – First Humanist Society of New York
 1930 – Humanism: A New Religion published by Charles Francis Potter(1885-1962) 
 1933 – Humanist Manifesto published
 1941 – American Humanist Association founded
 By region
 Humanism in Germany
 Humanism in France

 Humanist beliefs 
 Religious humanist beliefs 

 Secular humanist beliefs 
 Agnosticism– 
 Atheism– 
 Evolution–

 Humanist ethics 
 Humanist virtues and values 
 Common good– 
 Compassion– 
 Creativity–
 Empiricism– 
 Experience– 
 Experimentation– 
 Freethought– 
 Human dignity– 
 Humanitarianism– 
 Human rights– 
 Imagination– 
 Justice– 
 Knowledge– 
 Nature– 
 Observation– 
 Personal liberty– 
 Rationality– 
 Reason– 
 Scientific method– 
 Social responsibility

 Humanist culture 

 Ceremonies and services
 Celebrancy – movement to provide agents to officiate at ceremonies often reserved in law to clergy or officers of the courts. These agents, generally referred to as "celebrants", perform weddings, funerals, and other life ceremonies for those who do not want a traditional religious ceremony.
 Humanist officiant – person who performs secular humanist celebrancy services for weddings, funerals, child namings, coming of age ceremonies, and other rituals.
 Humanist baby naming – some humanists perform a naming ceremony as a non-religious alternative to ceremonies such as christening. The principle is conceptually similar to a civil wedding ceremony as an alternative to a religious wedding ceremony.
 Symbols
 Happy Human (pictured) – icon and the official symbol of the International Humanist and Ethical Union (IHEU), a world body of Humanist organizations, and has been adopted by many Humanist organisations and individuals worldwide.

 General concepts pertaining to and embraced by humanism 
Other humanist terms include:

 Ecosphere (global ecosystem)– 
 Ethical– 
 Ethics– 
 Evolutionary Humanism– 
 Life stance– 
 Non-theistic– 
 Rationalism– 
 Scientific skepticism– 
 Secular–

 Organizations 
 American Humanist Association – 
 Council for Secular Humanism – 
 Human-Etisk Forbund – the Norwegian Humanist Association
 Humanist Association of Canada – 
 Humanist Association of Ireland – 
 Humanist International – 
 Humanist Movement – 
 Humanist Party – 
 Humanist Society Scotland – 
 Humanists UK –
 Institute for Humanist Studies – 
 International Humanist and Ethical Union (IHEU) –  
 National Secular Society –
 Rationalist International – 
 Sidmennt – Icelandic Ethical Humanist AssociationFor more organizations see :Category:Humanist associations''

Humanists 

List of humanists

Leaders in humanism 
People who have made a major impact on the development or advancement of humanism:

 Charles Francis Potter – 
 Julian Huxley – 
 John Dewey – 
 Albert Einstein – 
 Thomas Mann – 
 F.C.S. Schiller – 
 Raymond B. Bragg – 
 Roy Wood Sellars – 
 Isaac Asimov – 
 Kurt Vonnegut –
 Pico Della Mirandola –
 Petrarch –

Other notable humanists 
 Phillip Adams – 
 Steve Allen – 
 Sir Arthur C. Clarke – 
 Richard Dawkins – 
 Gareth Evans – 
 Richard Feynman – 
 Tim Flannery – 
 E. M. Forster (see in particular "What I believe")– 
 William Hayden –  
 Thomas Jefferson – 
 Paul Kurtz – 
 Philip Nitschke – 
 Philip Pullman – 
 Gene Roddenberry – 
 Bertrand Russell – 
 Carl Sagan – 
 John Ralston Saul –
 Michael Shermer – 
 Peter Singer – 
 Barbara Smoker – 
 Ibn Warraq – 
 Robyn Williams – 
 E. O. Wilson –

Related philosophies 
 Empiricism – 
 Extropianism – 
 Freethought – 
 Infinitism – 
 Objectivism – 
 Philosophical naturalism – 
 Pragmatism – 
 Rationalism – 
 Rationalist movement – 
 Secularism –

See also 

 Humanistic psychology – branch of psychology that emphasizes an individual's inherent drive towards self-actualization and creativity. It holds that people are inherently good, and adopts a holistic approach to human existence which pays special attention to such phenomena as creativity, free will, and human potential.  While humanistic psychology is a specific division within the American Psychological Association, humanistic psychology is not so much a discipline within psychology as a perspective on the human condition that informs psychological research and practice.
 Social psychology – 
 Marxist humanism – branch of Marxism that focuses on Marx's earlier writings, especially the Economic and Philosophical Manuscripts of 1844 in which Marx espoused his theory of alienation, which they consider to be inseparable from his structural conception of capitalist society.
 Unitarian Universalism –
 Existential humanism –
 Integral humanism –

References

External links 

 The Philosophy of Humanism by Corliss Lamont
 Organizations
 Humanism at the Open Directory Project. A web portal to Humanist Societies.
 American Humanist Association
 Humanists International
 Humanists UK

Humanism
Humanism